Malnutrition–inflammation complex (syndrome) (MICS), also known as malnutrition–inflammation–cachexia syndrome, is a common condition in chronic disease states such as chronic kidney disease (where it is also known as uremic malnutrition or protein–energy malnutrition) and chronic heart failure.

The MICS is believed to be a cause of survival paradoxes seen in these distinct patient populations, also known as reverse epidemiology populations.

References

Syndromes
Nutrition